Club Deportivo Mirandés is a Spanish football team based in Miranda de Ebro, Province of Burgos, in the autonomous community of Castile and León. Founded on 3 May 1927, the club competes in the Segunda División, holding home matches at Estadio Municipal de Anduva.

History
Mirandés' origins can be traced to the beginnings of the 20th century, with clubs such as El Deportivo Mirandés (1917), Sporting Club Mirandés (1919), Deportivo SC (1919), and Miranda Unión Club (1922) all being its predecessors. Club Deportivo was founded as such on 3 May 1927, playing its first game on 4 June in the Saint John of the Mountain Festival, against Arabarra, winning 1–0 courtesy of a Fidel Angulo goal; the team's first president was Arturo García del Río, with the organization's initial capital consisting of 666 shares of 15 pesetas each.

From 1944 to 1977, Mirandés competed in Tercera División, with the exception of three seasons spent in the regional leagues. The club's debut in Tercera división took place on 24 September 1944, with a 2–2 draw against Vasconia from San Sebastián.

One of the best Mirandés campaigns during these years was in 1957–58 season, when under the presidency of Andrés Espallargas and with Juan Malón as a coach, the club finished in 2nd in Tercera división.

In 1977–78, Mirandés moved to the newly created Segunda División B, lasting five years, twice unsuccessful in the promotion playoffs. On 28 December 1977, the team faced Mario Kempes and Valencia at home in the Copa del Rey, losing 2–4; future Real Madrid player and La Liga manager Miguel Ángel Portugal played with the team during this decade.

In 1986, Mirandés was one of the founders of the La Rioja Football Federation. Three years later, the club won its first major trophy, conquering the fourth level championship under 23-year-old manager Juan Manuel Lillo. The team went on to fluctuate between divisions three and four in the following years, again experiencing the odd visit to the regional levels (two seasons).

21st century
Mirandés returned to the third division in the 2008–09 campaign, following two seasons in which the club finished the regular season top of the table only to fall short in the playoffs. In the decisive match, the team won against Jerez Industrial 3–2 at home (4–2 on aggregate).

In 2011–12, Mirandés started the league with a run of 833 minutes without conceding a goal, eventually losing its first match in the 18th game. In the season's domestic cup, the club reached the semi-finals – becoming the first third-tier team to make it to that stage since Figueres in the 2001–02 edition – after disposing of top level sides Villarreal, Racing Santander, and Espanyol, falling to Athletic Bilbao. At the end of that season, the team was promoted to Segunda División for the first time ever, after defeating Atlético Baleares in the playoffs. In the 2012–13 season, they managed to remain in Segunda División by finishing 15th out of 22 teams. There was another credible cup run in 2015–16, Mirandés eliminating top-division opponents Málaga and Deportivo La Coruña before losing to Sevilla in the quarter-finals.

At the end of the 2016–17 season, Mirandés was relegated after spending five years in the second division. On 28 March 2019, Mirandés won the season's Copa Federación after beating Cornellà in the final. In the 2018–19 season, the club finished 3rd in Segunda División B, Group 2 and again was promoted to the Segunda División in the playoffs, coincidentally overcoming Atlético Baleares once more.

On 5 February 2020, Mirandés beat Villarreal 4–2 to reach the semi-finals of the 2019–20 Copa del Rey, also defeating two other La Liga teams Celta Vigo and Sevilla; their run was ended by eventual winners Real Sociedad.

Season to season

9 seasons in Segunda División
15 seasons in Segunda División B
50 seasons in Tercera División

Current squad

Reserve team

Out on loan

Current technical staff

   Sara Miranda   Eduardo Martínez

   Adrián Hernández   Javier Cañibano

Honours
Segunda División B: 2011–12, 2017–18
Tercera División: 1988–89, 2002–03, 2006–07, 2007–08
Copa Federación de España: 2018–19
Castilla y León Cup: 2011, 2012

Stadium

Mirandés plays home games at Estadio Municipal de Anduva. Owned by the Miranda de Ebro Town Hall, it was inaugurated on 22 January 1950, and has a capacity of 5,759 spectators (mostly seated), with a dimension of 105×68 meters of natural grass.

Additionally, it also held other sporting events, most notably the under-21 match between Spain and Poland in 2006 (0–1).

Prior to this stadium, the club played its matches in other settings. During its first year of life, it played at Campo de Kronne, which was located between the Carretera de Logroño and the Avenida República Argentina. The following year the team moved to another ground and, on 26 May 1928, the first game at Campo de La Estación took place, against Club Ciclista de San Sebastián, with the team remaining there until 1950.

Famous players
Note: this list includes players that have appeared in at least 100 league games and/or have reached international status.

 Iván Agustín
 Alain Arroyo
 César Caneda
 Iñaki Garmendia
 Pablo Infante
 Mikel Iribas
 Erik Jirka
 Gorka Kijera
 Mikel Martins
 Aritz Mújika
 Randy
 Oussama Souaidy

See

Famous coaches
 Juan Manuel Lillo (1988–89), (1990–91)
 José Ignacio Soler (2004)
 José María García de Andoin (2005)
 Ismael Urtubi (2005–06)
 Miguel Ángel Sola (2006–08)
 Julio Bañuelos (2008–10)
 Carlos Pouso (2010–13)
 Gonzalo Arconada (2013)
 Carlos Terrazas (2013–2016)
 Andoni Iraola (2019–2020)

See also
CD Mirandés B, reserve team.

References

External links
 
Futbolme team profile 
BDFutbol team profile
Unofficial website 

 
Football clubs in Castile and León
Association football clubs established in 1927
Miranda de Ebro
1927 establishments in Spain
Segunda División clubs